Samsung Biologics is a South Korean biotechnology company headquartered in Songdo, Incheon, South Korea. The biotech division of Samsung Group, it provides contract development and manufacturing (CDMO) services to the biopharmaceutical industry.

The company has partnered with GlaxoSmithKline, Eli Lilly and AstraZeneca for COVID-19 treatments. Samsung Biologics also partnered with Moderna for fill-finish, packaging and labeling of its mRNA vaccine, Spikevax, and Greenlight Biosciences on the manufacturing of mRNA vaccine drug substance candidate during the COVID-19 pandemic.

History
Founded in 2011, Samsung Biologics built three manufacturing plants with a capacity of more than 360,000 liters, from 2011 to 2018, making it the world's largest contract-based manufacturer in the biopharmaceutical sector at a single site as of 2018. Since 2020, Samsung Biologics has operated a research and development center in San Francisco, California.

In 2012, it established Samsung Bioepis, a biosimilar medicine producer, with Biogen. The company acquired full ownership of Samsung Bioepis in 2022 by purchasing all remaining shares from Biogen for $2.3 billion.

In November 2019, Samsung Biologics became the first contract manufacturing organization to obtain ISO 27001 certification and the first in the Korean biopharma industry to obtain an ISO 22301 certification in May 2020. In 2020, Samsung Biologics introduced S-CHOice, a cell line expression technology, and S-Cellerate to shorten the period for developing drugs the next year. The company also obtained ISO 45001, 50001, 14001, 9001 in May 2021 and ISO 37001, 27001, 27017 in 2022.

Samsung Biologics published its first annual sustainability report in June 2021. The company also joined the Frontier 1.5D initiative, which works to limit the temperature rise within 1.5 degrees from pre-industrial times. It was added to the Dow Jones Sustainability World Index later that year.

References

Biopharmaceutical companies
Samsung
Companies based in Incheon
Companies listed on the Korea Exchange